Concord Community Schools may refer to:
 Concord Community Schools (Indiana)
 Concord Community Schools (Michigan)